Vachon is a surname.

Persons
Notable people with the surname include:

members of the Canadian professional wrestling Vachon family:
Luna Vachon (1962–2010), ring name of professional wrestler Gertrude Vachon 
Maurice Vachon (1929–2013), retired Canadian professional wrestler, known by his ring name "Mad Dog" Vachon
Paul Vachon (born 1938), former professional wrestler 
Vivian Vachon (1951–1991), female professional wrestler
Auguste Vachon, Canadian officer of arms
Christine Vachon (born 1962), American movie producer
Florian Vachon (born 1985), French professional road bicycle racer
François Vachon de Belmont (1645–1732), fifth superior of the Montreal Sulpicians
Jean Vachon (1903–1989), American silent film actress
John Vachon (1914–1975), American photographer
Louis-Albert Vachon (1912–2006), cardinal of the  Roman Catholic Church, and Archbishop Emeritus of Quebec 
Nicholas Vachon (born 1972), Canadian ice hockey player
Pierre Vachon (1738–1803), French classical composer
Reginald I. Vachon (born 1937), American mechanical engineer
Rogatien Vachon (born 1945), Canadian ice hockey goaltender

Characters
 Mme. Vachon, a fictional character from the 2003 film Who Killed Bambi? (2003 film)

See also